An estrogen ester is an ester of an estrogen, most typically of estradiol but also of other estrogens such as estrone, estriol, and even nonsteroidal estrogens like diethylstilbestrol. Esterification renders estradiol into a prodrug of estradiol with increased resistance to first-pass metabolism, slightly improving its oral bioavailability. In addition, estrogen esters have increased lipophilicity, which results in a longer duration when given by intramuscular or subcutaneous injection due to the formation of a long-lasting local depot in muscle and fat. Conversely, this is not the case with intravenous injection or oral administration. Estrogen esters are rapidly hydrolyzed into their parent estrogen by esterases once they have been released from the depot. Because estradiol esters are prodrugs of estradiol, they are considered to be natural and bioidentical forms of estrogen.

Estrogen esters are used in hormone therapy, hormonal contraception, and high-dose estrogen therapy (e.g., for prostate cancer and breast cancer), among other indications. The first estrogen ester to be marketed was estradiol benzoate in 1933, which was followed by many more. One of the most widely used estradiol esters is estradiol valerate, which was first introduced in 1954. Other major estradiol esters that are or have been used in medicine include estradiol acetate, estradiol cypionate, estradiol dipropionate, estradiol enantate, estradiol undecylate, and polyestradiol phosphate (an estrogen ester polymer), as well as the nitrogen mustard alkylating antineoplastic agent estramustine phosphate (estradiol normustine phosphate).

The most common vehicles for injections of steroids and steroid esters are oil solutions, but aqueous solutions, aqueous suspensions, and emulsions have also been used. The durations of estrogen esters are not prolonged if they are given orally, vaginally, or by intravenous injection.

Pharmacology
Estrogen esters are essentially inactive themselves, with esters such as estradiol valerate and estradiol sulfate having about 2% of the affinity of estradiol for the estrogen receptor. Likewise, the estrogen ether mestranol (ethinylestradiol 3-methyl ether) has about 1% of the affinity of estradiol for the estrogen receptor. Estrone sulfate has less than 1% of the affinity of estradiol for the estrogen receptor. As such, estrogen esters do not bind to the estrogen receptor except at extremely high concentrations. The residual affinity of estrogen esters for the estrogen receptor in bioassays may actually be due to conversion into the parent estrogen, as attempts to prevent or limit this conversion have been found to abolish binding to the estrogen receptor and estrogenicity.

In general, the longer the fatty acid ester chain of an estrogen ester, the greater its lipophilicity, and the longer the duration of the estrogen ester with intramuscular injection. It has been said that, via intramuscular injection, the duration of estradiol benzoate (with an ester of length 1 carbon plus a benzene ring) is 2 to 3 days, of estradiol dipropionate (with two esters each of length 2 carbons) is 1 to 2 weeks, of estradiol valerate (ester of 5 carbons) is 1 to 3 weeks, and of estradiol cypionate (ester of 3 carbons plus a cyclopentane ring) is 3 to 4 weeks. Estradiol enantate (ester of 7 carbons) has a duration of around 20 days. Likewise, estradiol undecylate (ester of 10 carbons) has a very extended duration, which is longer than that of all of the aforementioned esters.

Polyestradiol phosphate is an atypical estradiol ester. It is a phosphoric acid ester of estradiol in the form of a polymer, with an average polymer chain length of approximately 13 repeat units of estradiol phosphate. It is slowly cleaved into estradiol and phosphoric acid by phosphatases. Compared to conventional estradiol esters, polyestradiol phosphate has an extremely long duration; its elimination half-life is approximately 70 days. Whereas conventional estradiol esters form a long-lasting depot in muscle and fat at the site of injection, this is not the case with polyestradiol phosphate. Instead, polyestradiol phosphate is taken up rapidly into the bloodstream following injection (by 90% within 24 hours), where it circulates, and is accumulated in the reticuloendothelial system. Unlike other estradiol esters, polyestradiol phosphate is resistant to hydrolysis, which may be because it is a phosphatase inhibitor and may inhibit its own metabolism.

Estrogen esters also occur naturally in the body, for instance estrogen conjugates like estrone sulfate and estrone glucuronide and the very long-lived lipoidal estradiol, which is constituted by ultra-long-chain esters like estradiol palmitate (ester of 16 carbons) and estradiol stearate (ester of 18 carbons).

Chemistry

Estradiol esters have an ester moiety, usually a straight-chain fatty acid (e.g., valeric acid) or an aromatic fatty acid (e.g., benzoic acid), attached at the C3 and/or C17β positions of the steroid nucleus. These alkoxy moieties are substituted in place of the hydroxyl groups present in the unesterified estradiol molecule. Fatty acid esters serve to increase the lipophilicity of estradiol, increasing its solubility in fat. This causes them to form a depot with intramuscular or subcutaneous injection and gives them a long duration when administered by these routes.

Some estradiol esters have other moieties instead of fatty acids as the esters. Such esters include sulfuric acid (as in estradiol sulfate), sulfamic acid (as in estradiol sulfamate), phosphoric acid (as in estradiol phosphate), glucuronic acid (as in estradiol glucuronide, and others (e.g., estramustine phosphate (estradiol 3-normustine 17β-phosphate)). These esters are all hydrophilic, and have greater water solubility than estradiol or fatty acid estradiol esters. Unlike fatty acid estradiol esters, water-soluble estradiol esters can be administered by intravenous injection.

A few estrogen esters are polymers. These include polyestradiol phosphate and polyestriol phosphate, which are polymers of estradiol phosphate and estriol phosphate monomers, respectively. The monomers are connected in both cases by phosphate groups via the C3 and C17β positions. Polyestradiol phosphate has an average polymer chain length of approximately 13 repeat units of estradiol phosphate. That is, each polyestradiol phosphate molecule is a polymer consisting on average of 13 estradiol phosphate molecules bonded together. These polymeric estrogen esters are hydrophilic and water-soluble. Upon intramuscular injection, they do not form a depot and instead are rapidly absorbed into the circulation. However, they are only slowly cleaved into monomers, and as a result, have a very long duration in the body even outlasting that of many longer-chain fatty-acid estrogen esters.

See also
 Pharmacokinetics of estradiol
 List of estrogen esters
 List of estrogens
 Steroid ester
 Progestogen ester
 Androgen ester

References

Further reading
 
 
 
 

 
Estrogens
Prodrugs